La Raya de Calobre is a corregimiento in Calobre District, Veraguas Province, Panama with a population of 496 as of 2010. Its population as of 1990 was 466; its population as of 2000 was 495.

References

Corregimientos of Veraguas Province